The 1989 Taipei Women's Championships was a women's tennis tournament played on outdoor hard courts in Taipei, Taiwan that was part of the Category 1 tier of the 1989 WTA Tour. It was the fourth edition of the tournament and was held from 24 April through 30 April 1989. First-seeded Anne Minter won the singles title.

Finals

Singles

 Anne Minter defeated  Cammy MacGregor 6–1, 4–6, 6–2
 It was Minter's only singles title of the year and the 4th and last of her career.

Doubles

 Maria Lindström /  Heather Ludloff defeated  Cecilia Dahlman /  Nana Miyagi 4–6, 7–5, 6–3
 It was Lindstrom's first doubles title of her career. It was Ludloff's only doubles title of the year and the 2nd of her career.

References

External links
 ITF tournament edition details
 Tournament draws

Taipei Women's Championship
Taipei Women's Championship
Taipei Women's Championship, 1989
Taipei Women's Championship, 1989